Ramat David Israeli Air Force Base (Basis Kheil HaAvir Ramat David) is one of three principal airbases of the Israeli Air Force, located southeast of Haifa, close to kibbutz Ramat David and Megiddo in the Jezreel Valley. It was originally built as a Royal Air Force station in 1942 under the British Mandate when it was known as RAF Ramat David. In 2014, it was reported to be the most likely location for a new International airport to complement Ben Gurion Airport.

History
Roald Dahl, in his World War II autobiography 'Going Solo', mentions landing his RAF Hawker Hurricane at Ramat David in 1941. At the time it was a hastily prepared grass airstrip rolled out in a cornfield by the residents of the nearby kibbutz.

RAF Ramat David
RAF Ramat David was a Royal Air Force station in the British Mandate of Palestine between 1942 and 1948, located approximately 4 km south of Ramat Yishay (Northern District); 80 km north-northeast of Tel Aviv.

Royal Air Force operational units at RAF Ramat David:
No. 6 Squadron RAF
No. 32 Squadron RAF
No. 37 Squadron RAF
No. 46 Squadron RAF
No. 74 Squadron RAF
No. 127 Squadron RAF
No. 154 Squadron RAF
No. 208 Squadron RAF
No. 213 Squadron RAF
No. 216 Squadron RAF
No. 232 Squadron RAF
No. 242 Squadron RAF
No. 243 Squadron RAF
No. 249 Squadron RAF
No. 294 Squadron RAF
No. 459 Squadron RAAF
No. 651 Squadron RAF

After the Israeli Declaration of Independence and the start of the 1948 Arab-Israeli War, the base was temporarily maintained by the RAF to cover the withdrawal of British forces from Palestine. On 22 May, the Royal Egyptian Air Force attacked the base, mistakenly believing it was an Israeli airbase. In a series of three attacks, several aircraft were destroyed or damaged, a hangar was destroyed, and four airmen were killed. Five Egyptian fighter planes were shot down.

Israeli Air Force Base Ramat David

On 26 May 1948 the base was handed over to the newly created Israel Defense Forces. Ramat David currently houses two F-16 C/D squadrons, including 117 "First Jet" squadron, formed on 7 June 1953, and a Eurocopter AS565 Panther squadron. In 2010, the airbase was the second-largest unit in the IDF with over 1,100 soldiers.

Israeli Air Force Units
101 Squadron (Israel) F-16C/D ("First Fighter")
105 Squadron (Israel) F-16C/D ("Scorpion")
109 Squadron (Israel) F-16D ("Valley")
193 Squadron (Israel) AS-565 ("Defenders Of The West")

See also
List of former Royal Air Force stations
List of airports in Israel

References

Bibliography

 Jefford, C.G. RAF Squadrons, a Comprehensive Record of the Movement and Equipment of all RAF Squadrons and their Antecedents since 1912. Shrewsbury, Shropshire, UK: Airlife Publishing, 2001. .
 Sturtivant, Ray, ISO and John Hamlin. RAF Flying Training And Support Units since 1912. Tonbridge, Kent, UK: Air-Britain (Historians) Ltd., 2007. .

External links

Ramat David from globalsecurity.org
Aeroflight World Airforces

Airfields of the United States Army Air Forces
Military units and formations established in 1942
Military units and formations established in 1948
Israeli Air Force bases
World War II airfields in Mandatory Palestine